Kalino is the name of several inhabited localities in Russia.

Urban localities
Kalino, Chusovoy, Perm Krai, a work settlement under the administrative jurisdiction of the city of krai significance of Chusovoy, Perm Krai

Rural localities
Kalino, Arkhangelsk Oblast, a village in Moseyevsky Selsoviet of Mezensky District of Arkhangelsk Oblast
Kalino, Osinsky District, Perm Krai, a village in Osinsky District, Perm Krai
Kalino, Yaroslavl Oblast, a village in Borisoglebsky Rural Okrug of Tutayevsky District of Yaroslavl Oblast